Chicoutimi-Saguenay (or Chicoutimi et Saguenay) was a former provincial electoral district in the province of Quebec, Canada.

It was created for the 1867 election (and an electoral district of that name existed earlier in the Legislative Assembly of the Province of Canada). Its final election was in 1908.  It disappeared in the 1912 election and its successor electoral districts were Charlevoix-Saguenay, Chicoutimi, and Lac-Saint-Jean.

Members of the Legislative Assembly
 Pierre-Alexis Tremblay, Independent - Liberal (1867–1874)
 Michel Guillaume Baby, Conservative Party (1874–1875)
 William Evan Price, Conservative - Independent Conservative (1875–1880)
 Joseph-Élisée Beaudet, Conservative Party (1880–1881)
 Élie Saint-Hilaire, Independent Conservative (1881–1888)
 Séverin Dumais, Parti national (1888–1890)
 Onésime Côté, Parti national (1890–1892)
 Honoré Petit, Conservative Party - Liberal (1892–1912)

External links
 Election results (National Assembly)
 Election results (Quebecpolitique.com)

Former provincial electoral districts of Quebec
Politics of Saguenay, Quebec